Lacinipolia buscki is a species of cutworm or dart moth in the family Noctuidae first described by William Barnes and Foster Hendrickson Benjamin in 1927. It is found in Australia and North America.

The MONA or Hodges number for Lacinipolia buscki is 10421.

References

Further reading

 
 
 
 

Eriopygini
Articles created by Qbugbot
Moths described in 1927